Cuivre Township is one of eight townships in Audrain County, Missouri, United States. As of the 2010 census, its population was 5,125.

Cuivre Township takes its name from Cuivre Creek.

Geography
It contains five cemeteries: Edwards, Evergreen Memorial Gardens, Farber, Fike and Payne.

The streams of Bear Slough, Hickory Creek and Lost Creek run through this township.

Transportation
Cuivre Township contained one airport or landing strip, Vandalia Airpark, which has since been plowed and used for farmland by the owner.

References

 USGS Geographic Names Information System (GNIS)

External links
 US-Counties.com
 City-Data.com

Townships in Audrain County, Missouri
Townships in Missouri